Mario Acevedo (born July 6, 1955) is an American novelist and artist, known for his series of urban fantasy novels featuring the vampire private investigator Felix Gomez.  He lives and works in Denver, Colorado. Acevedo was born in El Paso, Texas. Before becoming a published writer, Acevedo held jobs as a military helicopter pilot, paratrooper, infantry officer, engineer, art teacher, software programmer, and assorted others. He was also deployed as a soldier and artist for the U.S. Army during Operation Desert Storm.

Bibliography

Felix Gomez series 
The Nymphos of Rocky Flats (2006)
X-Rated Bloodsuckers (2007)
The Undead Kama Sutra (2008)
Jailbait Zombie (2009)
Werewolf Smackdown (2010)
Rescue From Planet Pleasure (2015)
Steampunk Banditos: Sex Slaves of Shark Island (2018)

Other works 
Killing the Cobra (2010) (co-written with Alberto Dose)
Good Money Gone (2013) (co-written with R.W. Kilborn)
University of Doom (2016)
Forgotten Letters (2016) (co-written with Kirk Raeber)
"Flawless" (short story), published in A Fistful of Dinosaurs (2018)

References

External links
Author's website

20th-century American novelists
21st-century American novelists
American crime fiction writers
American male novelists
Living people
20th-century American male writers
21st-century American male writers
1955 births
United States Army aviators